Cry No More is the second studio album by American singer-songwriter Danielle Nicole after Wolf Den. Her first release was a self-titled EP.  Cry No More was released on February 23, 2018.

Critical reception 

Martine Ehrenclou writing on Rock and Blues Muse, describes the album as a "standout" with "exquisite musicianship". Mark Thompson writing in Blues Blast magazine described the album as a triumph for the artist. George Graham in his album review, said the album is world-class and described it as tasteful blues-rock and soul, giving it an A grade for sound quality.

Awards 
In May 2019, Danielle Nicole's album Cry No More, received two Blues Music Awards for Contemporary Blues Female Artist and Bass Instrumentalist and garnered three additional Independent Blues Awards in September 2019 for best R&B Soul CD, Music Video for the album's title track, and R&B Soul Song for Prince's "How Come U Don't Call Me Anymore?".

Track listing

Personnel 
Adapted from the liner notes.
 Danielle Nicole – vocals, bass
 Kudisan Kai – backing vocal (tracks: 1, 2, 4 5)
 Maxanne Lewis – backing vocal (tracks: 1, 2, 4, 5)
 Tony Braunagel – drums
Brandon Miller – guitar (track 10)
 Nick Schnebelen – guitar (track 1)
 Johnny Lee Schell – guitar (tracks: 2,3,4,5,6, 8,10,14), fiddle (track 7)
 Kenny Wayne Shepherd – guitar (track 8)
 Luther Dickinson – guitar (track 14)
 Walter Trout – guitar (track 4)
 Sonny Landreth – slide guitar (track 2)
 Mike Finnigan – keyboards, organ (track 2, 4, 5, 6, 8, 10)
 Mike Sedovic – keyboards, organ (track 1,3)

Charts

References 

2018 albums
Danielle Nicole albums
Concord Records albums